
Gmina Małdyty is a rural gmina (administrative district) in Ostróda County, Warmian-Masurian Voivodeship, in northern Poland.

Villages
Gmina Małdyty contains the villages and settlements of Bagnity, Bartno, Budwity, Budyty, Dobrocin, Drynki, Dziśnity, Ostróda County, Fiugajki, Gizajny, Ględy, Gumniska Małe, Gumniska Wielkie, Jarnołtówko, Jarnołtowo, Kadzie, Karczemka, Kęty, Kiełkuty, Klonowy Dwór, Koszajny, Kozia Wólka, Kreki, Leśnica, Leszczynka Mała, Linki, Małdyty, Naświty, Niedźwiada, Plękity, Pleśno, Połowite, Rybaki, Sambród, Sambród Mały, Sarna, Sasiny, Smolno, Sople, Surzyki Małe, Surzyki Wielkie, Szymonówko, Szymonowo, Wielki Dwór, Wilamówko, Wilamowo, Wodziany, Zajezierze, Zalesie and Zduny.

Neighbouring gminas
Gmina Małdyty is bordered by the gminas of Miłomłyn, Morąg, Pasłęk, Rychliki, Stary Dzierzgoń and Zalewo.

References
Polish official population figures 2006

Maldyty
Ostróda County